The 5000 metres speed skating event was part of the speed skating at the 1924 Winter Olympics programme. The competition was held on Saturday, January 26, 1924. Thirty-one speed skaters from thirteen nations were due to compete, but nine athletes withdrew, so in the end twenty-two speed skaters from ten nations competed. The Canadian athlete Charles Gorman abandoned the race after the first round.

Medalists

Records
These were the standing world and Olympic records (in minutes) prior to the 1924 Winter Olympics.

The following records were set during this competition.

Results

The event was held Saturday afternoon.

Notes

References

External links
Official Olympic Report
 

Speed skating at the 1924 Winter Olympics

sv:Hastighetsåkning på skridskor vid olympiska vinterspelen 1924 – herrarnas 1 500 meter